Atrévete a olvidarme (English title: Dare to forget me) is a short-lived Mexican telenovela produced by Roberto Hernández Vázquez for Televisa in 2001. It run for only one month in 2001.

On August 6, 2001, Canal de las Estrellas started broadcasting Atrévete a olvidarme weekdays at 5:00pm, replacing Esmeralda. The last episode was broadcast on September 7, 2001.

Jorge Salinas and Adriana Fonseca starred as protagonists, while Alexis Ayala and Mariana Seoane starred as antagonists.

Plot
Many years ago, Gonzalo loved Elena. He broke up with Olga, what caused a tragedy that parted Elena's life. Now Gonzalo, old and married, lives in the village of Real del Monte, obsessed by the memory of his great love whose spirit haunts the place.

Daniel, nephew of Gonzalo and Olga, is a young journalist, motivated by a supernatural vision, comes to Real del Monte in order to visit his grandfather. There he falls in love with Andrea "la guapa" (the niece) and a romance begins in a way as tragical as the one Gonzalo lived. Andrea breaks up with the engineer Manuel, in spite of her promise.

Manuel, full of  hate, decides to take revenge. Scared, Andrea breaks up with Daniel, who falls in the trap of Ernestina, Manuel's sister. Andrea does not want to stay with Manuel, but she cannot return to Daniel. Her father's death lets her in financial problems. Desperate, Andrea decides to take refuge in the brothel of the village.

Cast
 
Jorge Salinas as Daniel González Rivas-Montaño
Adriana Fonseca as Andrea Rosales "La Guapa"
Alexis Ayala as Manuel Soto Castañeda
Mariana Seoane as Ernestina Soto Castañeda
Ignacio López Tarso as Don Gonzalo Rivas-Montaño
José Carlos Ruiz as Cecilio Rabadán
Ana Martín as Sabina
Macaria as Hanna Rivas-Montaño Bocker de González
Raquel Olmedo as La Coronela
Juan Peláez as Santiago Rosales
Adriana Roel as Evarista
Juan Carlos Bonet as Rosendo
Yolanda Ventura as Luján Beccar Varela
Jorge Poza as El Gato
Francesca Guillén as Lucina
Arsenio Campos as Patricio
Aurora Clavel as Eduarda
Socorro Avelar as Epitacia
Jaime Lozano as Father Buenaventura
Alejandra Barros as Olga Bocker de Rivas-Montaño
Rebeca Tamez as Elena Bocker
Olivia Cairo as Rita
Jacarandá Alfaro as Ludivina
Everardo de la Mora as Gerard
Hugo Macías Macotela as Dr. Nazario
Patricia Martínez as Refugio
Roberto Miquel as Vicencio
Queta Lavat as Fidela
Edgar Ponce as Soriano
Luis Reynoso as Melesio
Alberto Estrella as Yong Gonzalo Rivas-Montaño
Daniela Aedo as Child Andrea Rosales

References

External links
 at esmas.com 

2001 telenovelas
Mexican telenovelas
2001 Mexican television series debuts
2001 Mexican television series endings
Spanish-language telenovelas
Television shows set in Mexico
Televisa telenovelas